The Ministry of State Resources and Enterprise Development is a ministry in the Government of Sri Lanka.

List of State Resources and Enterprise Development Ministers

The Minister of State Resources and Enterprise Development is an appointment in the Cabinet of Sri Lanka.

Parties

References

External links
 Ministry of State Resources and Enterprise Development
 Government of Sri Lanka

State Resources and Enterprise Development
State Resources and Enterprise Development